Newbridge is a village within the parish of Kirkliston, to the west of Edinburgh, Scotland. It originally lay on the western edge of the county of Midlothian; however, local government reforms in the late 20th century placed it within the jurisdiction of the City of Edinburgh Council.

Newbridge (including Ratho Station) had a total population of 1,074 at the 2011 Census based on the 2010 definition of the locality.

Archaeology 
Excavations in advance of a phased commercial development in 2007 and 2014 by AOC Archaeology revealed human activity in Newbridge from the Mesolithic to the medieval period. Radiocarbon dating put the earliest human activity in the area at 6640–6230 BC. There was a scatter of domestic settlement in the Middle Bronze Age (radio carbon dates of 1700-1200 BC) and pre-Roman Iron Age. They also believe there may be the remnants of a barrow cemetery. The archaeologists also identified a section of Dere Street, a Roman road. Finally, there was evidence that the area was farmed in the 11th to 12th centuries and in the 13th to 14th centuries AD, a pattern reflected in other medieval settlement in the Lothians.

Newbridge Chariot 

The remains of an Iron Age chariot burial were found near the Bronze Age burial mound at Huly Hill, Newbridge, in advance of development at the Edinburgh Interchange. The chariot was the first of its kind to be found in Scotland.

Local amenities

Newbridge has an industrial estate, two car dealerships, a Royal Bank of Scotland branch, a pub with a large beer garden (the Newbridge Inn, founded in 1683), a bowling club, a McDonald's restaurant, a petrol station, a Premier Inn (with Thyme restaurant), a cafe and  a fish and chip shop.  There is a Scotmid nearby at Ratho Station. Larger supermarkets can be found in Broxburn. A doctor's surgery and a chemist are located in Ratho.

Transport

Road 

The Newbridge roundabout was built in 1970 as a flat roundabout serving the M8 Edinburgh to Glasgow motorway, the M9 Edinburgh to Stirling motorway, the A8 and the A89. One of the busiest roundabouts in Scotland, traffic congestion became intolerable and it was converted to a grade-separated roundabout interchange in 1997, becoming Junction 1 of the M9. The A8 (dual carriageway to Maybury junction only) runs from the Newbridge Roundabout into Edinburgh City Centre. The A89 road runs from Newbridge roundabout to Broxburn.

Bus 

Newbridge is served by several bus services

McGill's Scotland East 
 18 (Edinburgh - Broxburn - Dechmont - Bathgate)
 20 (Slateford - Kingsknowe - Wester Hailes - Edinburgh Park - Ratho Station - Ratho)
 X24 (Deans - Eliburn - Livingston - Pumpherston - Broxburn - Edinburgh)
 X25 (Blackridge - Armadale - Bathgate - Deans - Livingston - Broxburn - Edinburgh)
 X38 (Stirling - Plean - Larbert - Falkirk - Linlithgow - Kirkliston - Edinburgh)
 63 (Balerno - Currie - Riccarton - Sighthill - Gyle Centre - Newbridge - Kirkliston - Queensferry)
 600 (Whitburn - Livingston - Broxburn - Winchburgh - Kirkliston - Edinburgh Airport)

Lothian Country Buses 

 X18 (Whitburn - Armadale - Bathgate - Dechmomt - Broxburn - Edinburgh)
 275 (Bathgate - Seafield - Livingston - Pumpherston - Broxburn - Gyle Centre - Hermiston Gait)

Stagecoach East Scotland 

 X51 (Dunfermline Bus Station, Forth Road Bridge, Queensferry, Kirkliston, Livingston, Harthill, Glasgow Bus Station)

Air 

Newbridge is about a mile from Edinburgh Airport's Terminal Building.

Tram 

Newbridge will be the western terminus of Tram Line 2.

Schools 

Newbridge shares Hillwood Primary School with Ratho Station.  Newbridge is in the catchment area for Craigmount High School.

Sources 

Areas of Edinburgh
Villages in Edinburgh council area